Claver Gatete (born 23 May 1962) is a Rwandan politician and ambassador, who currently serves as Rwanda's Permanent Representative to the United Nations as of March 28, 2022. He previously served as the Minister of Infrastructure in the Rwandan cabinet. Prior to his Cabinet appointment in April 2018, he served as Minister of Finance and Economic Planning from 2013 to 2018. He has previously served as the Governor of the National Bank of Rwanda and as Rwanda's ambassador to the United Kingdom, Ireland, and Iceland.

Background and education
Claver Gatete was born in Mbarara, Uganda on 23 May 1962, where he was raised and educated. He holds a Bachelor of Science in Agricultural Economics from the University of British Columbia, Vancouver, awarded in 1991. His Master of Science, also in Agricultural Economics, was awarded in 1993, by the same university.

Career
Upon the completion of his university studies, Gatete worked in Canada as an economist between 1991 and 1997, and then worked as the national economist with the United Nations Development Programme in Rwanda until 2000.

In October 2001, Gatete joined the office of the president as the president's personal representative to NEPAD's Steering Committee. He concurrently served as the Coordinator of the National African Peer Review Mechanism (APRM) and as a Member of the NEPAD's African Partnership Forum (APF), until November 2003.

For a period of two years, from November 2003 until November 2005, he served as the Secretary to the Treasury, in the Finance and Economic Planning ministry.

From November 2005 until December 2009, Gatete was Rwanda's ambassador to the UK, Ireland and Iceland, before joining the National Bank of Rwanda as the deputy governor. He then served as the Governor of the National Bank of Rwanda from May 2011, before his appointment as the Minister of Finance.

He was appointed Minister of Infrastructure in April 2018, replacing James Musoni. He was replaced as Minister of Finance of Rwanda by Uzziel Ndagijimana.

Other activities
 African Development Bank (AfDB), Ex-Officio Member of the Board of Governors (2013-2018)

See also
 Cabinet of Rwanda

Film appearance
Motherland film (2010)

References

External links
Profile atWorld Economic Forum

1962 births
Governors of the National Bank of Rwanda
Finance ministers of Rwanda
Infrastructure ministers of Rwanda
Members of the Parliament of Rwanda
University of British Columbia alumni
Living people
21st-century Rwandan politicians
Ambassadors of Rwanda to Ireland
Ambassadors of Rwanda to Iceland
Ambassadors of Rwanda to the United Kingdom
People from Mbarara